Ha-Shaḥar was a Hebrew-language monthly periodical, published and edited at Vienna by Peretz Smolenskin from 1868 to 1884.

The journal contained scientific articles, essays, biographies, and literature, as well as general Jewish news. The objects of Smolenskin were to spread Englightenment and knowledge of the Hebrew language, and particularly to oppose obscurantism. Its publication was interrupted several times for lack of support. Ha-Shaḥar greatly influenced the Haskalah movement, especially in Russia, where it was well known. It was read secretly in the yeshivot, in private houses, and in the batte midrashot.

Contributors
Among the periodical's contributors were:

 Eliezer Ben-Yehuda
 
 Reuben Asher Braudes
 Salomon Buber
 
 Israel Frenkel
 Abraham Shalom Friedberg
 David Frischmann
 Judah Leib Gordon
 Avrom Ber Gotlober
 Hayyim Jonah Gurland
 Alexander Harkavy
 Ish-Shalom
 Adolf Jellinek
 Bertha Kreidmann
 Adam ha-Kohen
 David Kahana
 Isaac Kaminer
 
 
 Yehudah Leib Levin
 Joshua Lewinsohn
 Aaron Liebermann
 Moshe Leib Lilienblum
 Salomon Mandelkern
 Joel Müller
 I. L. Peretz
 
 Solomon Rubin
 Senior Sachs
 Isaac Hirsch Weiss
 Ze'ev Yavetz
 Samuel Leib Zitron

References

1868 establishments in Austria
1884 disestablishments in Austria
Haskalah
Hebrew-language journals
Hebrew-language newspapers
Jewish magazines
Jews and Judaism in Vienna
Magazines disestablished in 1884
Magazines established in 1868
Magazines published in Vienna